Kim Mi-jung (born 14 May 1977) is a South Korean fencer. She competed in the individual and team épée events at the 2004 Summer Olympics.

References

1977 births
Living people
South Korean female fencers
Olympic fencers of South Korea
Fencers at the 2004 Summer Olympics
Asian Games medalists in fencing
Fencers at the 2002 Asian Games
Asian Games gold medalists for South Korea
Medalists at the 2002 Asian Games
21st-century South Korean women